Here's Some That Got Away is the second compilation album by The Style Council, released in 1993. As the album cover states, the album contains rarities such as demos and B-sides, many of them previously unreleased. It follows 1992's Extras, featuring rarities by Paul Weller's previous band The Jam. The album is something of a sister album to The Singular Adventures of The Style Council, the band's 1989 singles compilation. The album cover is a photograph showing all four members taken in 1987, an outtake from the photo session producing the US album cover to The Cost of Loving. Other photographs from the session were later used for The Singular Adventures of The Style Council and Greatest Hits. Here's Some That Got Away reached 39 in the UK Album Chart with little promotion.

Track listing
"Love Pains" – 3:20 (Willie Clayton cover)
"Party Chambers" – 3:19 (B side of Speak Like a Child)
"The Whole Point II" – 2:49 (B side of Walls Come Tumbling Down!)
"The Ghosts Of Dachau" – 2:47 (B side of Shout to the Top!)
"Sweet Loving Ways" – 3:31 (B side of Life at a Top People's Health Farm)
"A Casual Affair" – 3:24
"A Woman's Song" – 2:31 (Demo version)
"Mick's Up" – 3:09 (B side of Money-Go-Round)
"Waiting On A Connection" – 3:05
"Night After Night" – 2:58 (David Sea cover)
"The Piccadilly Trail" –3:44 (B side of Shout to the Top!)
"(When You) Call Me" – 2:55 (Demo version)
"My Very Good Friend" – 3:38 
"April's Fool" – 3:01
"In Love For The First Time" – 3:38 (B side of How She Threw It All Away)
"Big Boss Groove" – 4:39 (B side of You're the Best Thing)
"Mick's Company" – 2:48 (B side of My Ever Changing Moods)
"Bloodsports" – 3:33 (B side of Walls Come Tumbling Down!)
"Who Will Buy" – 2:42 (B side of It Didn't Matter)
"I Ain't Goin' Under" – 3:17 
"I Am Leaving" – 3:36
"A Stone's Throw Away" – 1:50 (Demo version)

References

The Style Council albums
1993 compilation albums
Polydor Records compilation albums